Martin Oeggerli (born 7 March 1974) is an internationally recognized Swiss photographer specializing in scientific microscopy and fine art, winning numerous awards for his work.

He studied biology at the University of Basel from 1994 to 2000 and obtained his diploma in 2002 under David G. Senn. In 2005, he obtained his PhD in molecular pathology under Guido Sauter at the University of Basel. Since 2006, he has been working in the research department of the University Hospital Basel as part of a project funded by the Swiss National Science Foundation and is also a consultant to a laboratory specializing in scanning electron microscopy (PTU GmbH).

Awards
 Lennart Nilsson Award 2022 
 German Prize for Scientific Photography 2011 1st prize
 International Photography Awards 2011 1st and 2nd prize category 'Special: Micro'
 Best Scientific Cover Image 2010 1st prize
 International Photography Awards 2010 2nd prize category 'Special: Micro'
 German Prize for Scientific Photography 2009 1st prize
 Images of Research 2009 3rd prize
 Best Scientific Cover Image 2008 1st prize
 Images of Research 2008 1st and 2nd prize
 Images of Research 2006 3rd prize

See also

 scanning electron microscopy

References

External links
 Martin Oeggerli's website
 Martin Oeggerli's summary as National Geographic photographer  
 Exquisite Castaways, September 2010 Feature Article in National Geographic
 Behind the Photos from National Geographic
 Love is in the Air, December 2009 Feature Article in National Geographic

Nature photographers
Living people
1974 births